Acacallis is a figure in Greek mythology, and the namesake of two genera of organisms:

Acacallis (moth), a synonym of the moth genus Eudocima in the family Erebidae
Acacallis (plant), a synonym of the orchid genus Aganisia in the family Orchidaceae